Maldon was a closed railway station on the Main South railway line in New South Wales, Australia. The station originally opened in 1889 as Wilton, renamed as Maldon a year later. It closed in 1976. South of the station site lay sidings to a cement works, whilst to the north of the station is the site of the incomplete junction of the unfinished Maldon-Dombarton line.

References

Disused regional railway stations in New South Wales
Railway stations in Australia opened in 1889
Railway stations closed in 1976
Main Southern railway line, New South Wales